Thomas "Tom or Tommy" McGinnis (born November 27, 1947) is an American professional golfer who played on the PGA Tour and the Champions Tour.

McGinnis was born in Memphis, Tennessee. He attended the University of Tennessee and was a member of the golf team from 1967–1969. He turned professional in 1969.

McGinnis had 49 starts in PGA Tour events during his regular career; he earned and lost his Tour card 3 times. His best finish in a PGA Tour event was a solo 5th at the 1976 Ed McMahon-Jaycees Quad Cities Open. His best finish in a major championship — the only major that he played — was 55th at the 1980 U.S. Open. He earned his living primarily as a club and teaching pro at various clubs in Tennessee, New York and Florida.

McGinnis has eight top-10 finishes in Champions tour events including one win. The highlight of his career was defeating Hale Irwin in a playoff at the 1999 BankBoston Classic. With his win, McGinnis deprived Irwin of the chance to match Chi-Chi Rodríguez's record of three straight titles in this event.

Today McGinnis works as a teaching pro at Pine Forest Country Club in Summerville, South Carolina. He is also an assistant coach for the boy's varsity golf team at Pinewood Preparatory School, the South Carolina 2006 Class AAA champions.

Amateur wins
1965 Tennessee Junior Amateur, International Jaycee Junior Golf Tournament
1969 Memphis City Amateur

Professional wins (6)

Regular career wins (5)
1971 Saskatchewan Open, Willow Park Classic (Canada)
1986 New York State Open
1996 Long Island PGA Championship, Long Island Open

Champions Tour wins (1)

Champions Tour playoff record (1–0)

See also
1972 PGA Tour Qualifying School graduates
Fall 1975 PGA Tour Qualifying School graduates
Fall 1978 PGA Tour Qualifying School graduates

References

External links

American male golfers
Tennessee Volunteers men's golfers
PGA Tour golfers
PGA Tour Champions golfers
Golfers from Memphis, Tennessee
1947 births
Living people